USS Dicky (SP-231) was a United States Navy patrol vessel in commission from 1917 to 1919.

Dicky was built as a civilian motorboat of the same name in 1913 by the Weckler Boat Company at Chicago, Illinois. The U.S. Navy leased her from her owner, C.N. Steele of Waukegan, Illinois, in April 1917 for World War I service as a patrol vessel. She was commissioned in mid-June 1917 as USS Dicky (SP-231).

Dicky was assigned to the 9th Naval District for duty on the Great Lakes on the section patrol for the remainder of World War I.

Dicky was returned to Steele on 14 January 1919.

References

Department of the Navy: Navy History and Heritage Command: Online Library of Selected Images: Civilian Ships: Dicky (American Motor Boat, 1913). Was USS Dicky (SP-231) in 1917-1919
NavSource Online: Section Patrol Craft Photo Archive: Dicky (SP 231)

Patrol vessels of the United States Navy
World War I patrol vessels of the United States
Great Lakes ships
Ships built in Chicago
1913 ships